Amat is a surname of Occitan and Catalan origin meaning "beloved". Notable bearers of the name include:

 Anna Aguilar-Amat (born 1962), Spanish writer
 Carlos Oquendo de Amat (1905–1936), Peruvian poet
 Félix Torres Amat (1772–1849), Spanish Bishop
 Jaume Amat (born 1970), Spanish field hockey player
 Jean-Charles Roman d'Amat (1887–1976), French librarian and historian
 Jean-Pierre Amat (born 1962), French sports shooter
 Joaquim Amat-Piniella (1913–1974), Spanish writer and politician
 Jordi Amat (born 1992), Spanish footballer
 Josefa Carpena-Amat, known as Pepita Carpeña (1919–2005), Spanish trade unionist, writer and anarchist
 Juan Amat (1946–2022), Spanish field hockey player
 Kiko Amat (born 1971), Spanish writer
 Luigi Amat di San Filippo e Sorso (1796–1878), Italian dean of the College of Cardinals
 Manuel de Amat y Junient  (1707–1782), Spanish military officer
 Pancho Amat (born 1950), Cuban tres musician
 Pascual Amat y Esteve (1856–1928), Spanish politician, military figure and lawyer 
 Pedro Amat (born 1940), Spanish field hockey player
 Pietro Amat di San Filippo (1826–1895) Italian geographer, historian and bibliographer
 Pol Amat (born 1978), Spanish field hockey player
 Rafael de Amat i de Cortada (1746–1819), Baron of Malda, Spanish writer
 Santiago Amat (1896-1982), Spanish competitive sailor
 Thaddeus Amat y Brusi (1810–1878), first Bishop of Los Angeles, California 
 Yamid Amat (born 1941), Colombian journalist

References

Catalan-language surnames